Melanie Lyn McGuire (née Slate; born October 8, 1972) is an American former nurse who was convicted of murdering her husband on April 28, 2004, in what media dubbed the "suitcase murder". She was sentenced to life in prison on July 19, 2007, and is serving her sentence at the Edna Mahan Correctional Facility for Women in Clinton, New Jersey. She will not be eligible for parole until she is 100 years old.

Early life and education
Melanie Lyn Slate grew up in Ridgewood and Middletown Township, New Jersey, attending Middletown High School South. She enrolled at Rutgers University with a double major in math and psychology and graduated in 1994. She graduated, second in her class, from the Charles E. Gregory School of Nursing (now Raritan Bay Medical Center) in 1997 with a nursing diploma. She married United States Navy veteran William T. "Bill" McGuire (born September 21, 1964) in 1999.

Murder
By April 2004, the McGuires had been married for five years. Melanie was a nurse at a fertility clinic and Bill was a computer programmer. The couple had two sons and lived in a Woodbridge Township, New Jersey, apartment, but planned to move that month to a larger home in Warren County. They closed the documents on their new house on April 28, but never moved in. That night, according to the prosecution, McGuire drugged her husband, shot him dead, and subsequently dismembered his body. She put his remains into a 3-piece suitcase set, and those three pieces were later found  in Chesapeake Bay.

Investigation 
On May 5, 2004, the first suitcase, containing human legs, was found by two fishermen and two children floating near the Chesapeake Bay Bridge–Tunnel's fourth artificial island, and a murder investigation was launched. On May 11, a second larger suitcase was found on the beach of Fisherman Island National Wildlife Refuge, by a graduate student cleaning up litter on the beach. This suitcase was found to contain the head and torso with three bullet wounds, two in the chest and one in the head. The third and smallest suitcase, containing arms, was recovered floating in the water near the Chesapeake Bay Bridge–Tunnel's second artificial island on May 16. Police released a facial reconstruction sketch of the victim, which an acquaintance of Bill McGuire's recognized. Melanie then became the prime suspect in the investigation. Because the murder did not occur in Virginia, however, authorities turned over their investigation to the New Jersey State Police.

During the investigation, incriminating evidence against Melanie was uncovered. On April 26, 2004, Melanie had purchased a .38 caliber handgun from a store in Easton, Pennsylvania; Bill had been killed with a .38 caliber handgun with wadcutter bullets. Melanie's receipt for the gun also listed an unspecified purchase of $9.95; there were only two items in the store for that amount, and one of them was a box of wadcutter bullets. Police received a tip from a private towing company employee who said he towed a 2002 Nissan Maxima (Bill McGuire's car) from the Flamingo Motel in Atlantic City, on May 8, 2004. Upon further investigation, police discovered a security video of the car being moved in the early morning hours of April 30, 2004. The footage was blurry and the police weren't able to identify the person in the video. Melanie later claimed she had moved the car as a "prank", even though she had applied for a protection from abuse order days earlier after allegedly being slapped by her husband. Police also learned that Melanie had been having a long-term affair with a co-worker named Bradley Miller. Her E-ZPass tag was recorded at a toll booth in Delaware two days after the murder; she claimed that this was the result of her going furniture shopping in Delaware, since it has no sales tax. Before she was charged with murder, Melanie contacted E-ZPass and attempted to have the $0.90 charge removed from her account history. Days later, an unidentified man, believed by many to be her stepfather, also contacted E-ZPass and attempted to have the charge removed.

The plastic bags that contained Bill's body parts and the bags that contained Bill's clothes, which Melanie had given away to a friend, were demonstrated by forensics to have been manufactured on the same assembly line within hours of one another. Melanie admitted that the couple owned the same set of luggage that the body was found in, a matching three-piece set of Kenneth Cole suitcases. Green fibers had been found on one of the bullets lodged in Bill's chest; the fibers were identified as polyester fill, a common material found in household furniture. Bill and Melanie owned a green couch, and investigators theorized that the murderer used a pillow or couch cushion as a makeshift silencer to shoot Bill. Similarly, a medical grade towel found with Bill's body matched those stocked at the clinic where Melanie worked. A witness testified that Melanie used the same towels to protect furniture when she moved. Police believed that she used a syringe and prescription from her work to obtain the drug used as a means to incapacitate her husband.

Trial
On June 2, 2005, more than a year after the murder, Melanie dropped her children off at child care and preschool. After exiting the older child's school, Melanie started walking toward her vehicle when law enforcement emerged from the bushes, taking her into custody without incident. She was immediately booked into the Middlesex County Adult Correctional Center on first-degree murder charges, but made her $750,000 bail ($ million today). Through her attorneys, Joe Tacopina, Steve Turano, and Marc Ward, she pleaded not guilty to the charges.

After being released on bail, Melanie faced additional charges on October 11, 2005. A four-count indictment came down from a state grand jury. Her bail was raised to $2.1 million ($ million today), but she was again released. More than a year later, on October 26, 2006, McGuire was charged with two counts of hindering apprehension for allegedly writing letters to police aimed at getting them off her trail. She again pleaded not guilty and was released after posting $10,000 bail.

Almost three years after the crime, McGuire's murder trial commenced at the Middlesex County Courthouse in New Brunswick, New Jersey on March 5, 2007. Prosecutors contended her motive for murder was to take up a new life with her lover. McGuire persisted in claiming she was innocent, and claimed her husband had become increasingly moody and unpredictable and was a compulsive gambler.

On April 23, 2007, McGuire's murder trial jury found her guilty of first-degree murder, finding that the evidence established her culpability for the murder beyond a reasonable doubt. She was also convicted of the lesser charges of perjury, desecration of human remains, and possession of a weapon for an unlawful purpose. However, McGuire was acquitted of the two counts of hindering apprehension, as well as tampering with evidence and possession of Xanax without prescription.

Shortly after her conviction, but before sentencing, McGuire appealed for a new trial on the basis of the story of jailhouse informant Christopher Thieme that her husband was deeply in debt and may have been killed by Atlantic City mobsters. However, prosecutors established that the informant was "entirely incredible and routinely and habitually fabricates stories" according to a New Jersey State Police investigation, before recanting and accusing McGuire's attorney of suborning perjury. With the story debunked, the request for a new trial was withdrawn. On July 19, 2007, at the age of 34, McGuire was sentenced to life in prison.

Aftermath
During her arraignment on murder charges, McGuire's case was dubbed the "Suitcase Murder" by various media outlets. Author John Glatt wrote a book about the case, entitled To Have and To Kill. The case has been profiled on television outlets: Snapped Oxygen Network; Dateline NBC; 48 Hours Mystery CBS;  and The Investigators TruTV; Deadly Affairs Investigation Discovery, and Forensic Files II, among other true crime television shows.

McGuire's conviction was affirmed by an appeals court on March 16, 2011. She must serve more than 63 years before she is eligible for parole. On September 20, 2011, the New Jersey Supreme Court declined to hear her further appeal. On April 29, 2014, McGuire filed a motion for post-conviction relief, alleging ineffective assistance of counsel and newly discovered evidence.

On September 25, 2014, McGuire appeared in court with her new attorney Lois DeJulio, a public defender, to try to get a hearing that could overturn her 2007 murder conviction, on the grounds that her previous legal representation by Joe Tacopina was inadequate or ineffective. The request was subsequently denied.

Adaptation
In 2022, Lifetime produced a movie called Suitcase Killer: The Melanie McGuire Story as part of its "Ripped from the Headlines" series of movies for television. The film stars Candice King as Melanie McGuire, Michael Roark as William McGuire, Jackson Hurst as Bradley Miller, and Wendie Malick as Patricia Prezioso.

References

1972 births
American female murderers
American people convicted of murder
American prisoners sentenced to life imprisonment
People convicted of murder by New Jersey
Prisoners sentenced to life imprisonment by New Jersey
Living people
Middletown High School South alumni
People from Brick Township, New Jersey
People from Middletown Township, New Jersey
People from Woodbridge Township, New Jersey
Rutgers University alumni
Mariticides
21st-century American criminals